East Passyunk Crossing is a South Philadelphia neighborhood. Its location is considered to be from Tasker Street to Snyder Avenue, Broad Street to 6th Street.

The address range of southbound and northbound streets is 1600 to 2099, and of eastbound and westbound streets it is 600 to 1399.

The name and boundaries of East Passyunk Crossing originated when the East Passyunk Crossing Civic Association (EPX), a Registered Community Organization of the City of Philadelphia, was formed. The neighborhood is bounded by the neighborhoods of Newbold to its west, Passyunk Square to its north, Dickinson Square West and Greenwich to its east, and Lower Moyamensing to its south.

Demographics

The neighborhood has a population of over 12,000 residents, with the majority being homeowners, and the median age is about 35. The rowhouse is the primary type of home construction, most built over 100 years ago. 

The increasing LGBT population in the area, along with LGBT-owned or friendly businesses in the area has led some to name the area the "New Gayborhood". Joseph F. Marino, co-chair of the East Passyunk Crossing Civic Association and Town Watch said, "When I was a boy, there were maybe three gay men in the neighborhood. Now there are three on every block."

Shopping district

The East Passyunk Avenue Shopping District encompasses over 150 independently owned businesses, including many restaurants, along Passyunk Avenue from 9th to Broad Streets. 

The City of Philadelphia designated Passyunk Avenue from the south side of Federal Street to the east side of Broad Street as the East Passyunk Avenue Business Improvement District, and collects levies from the approximately 300 commercial properties there, in order to promote the Avenue, for sidewalk sweeping and beautification, economic development, and personnel and general operation expenses.

The Passyunk Avenue Revitalization Corporation, a non-profit real estate development and management company, owns and leases many properties and maintains the public space along the East Passyunk Avenue corridor.

Regularly spaced along the sidewalks of East Passyunk Avenue, from Broad to Tasker Streets, are embedded 88 cast iron medallions,  round, displaying the name East Passyunk Avenue and the face and headdress of an indigenous person. The logo has been used in promotional materials for the shopping district since around the turn of the 21st century. The design was called out in 2018 for its "casual racism" and inaccurate portrayal of the headdress worn by the Lenni-Lenape people who lived in the area, and in October 2020 the East Passyunk Avenue Business Improvement District began the process to replace the logo.

Major landmarks

The East Passyunk Gateway Park is a landscaped triangle bounded by Passyunk Avenue, McKean and Broad Streets, located at the traffic entrance to the East Passyunk Avenue shopping district.

The Joey Giardello Statue park, situated in the triangle formed by Passyunk Avenue, Mifflin and 13th Streets, is a tree covered relaxation space with tables and benches. It features a statue, installed May 21, 2011, honoring the 1963 world middleweight boxing champion Joey Giardello.

The History of Italian Immigration Museum, 1834 East Passyunk Avenue, celebrates Italian-Americans represented throughout U.S. society, the Supreme Court, sports, show business, politics, science, art, and music.

On the northwestern border of the neighborhood can be found The Singing Fountain, situated in the triangle formed by Passyunk Avenue, Tasker and 11th Streets. Besides being a popular relaxation spot, with tables and benches, and hidden speakers that play music, it is used by the Shopping District for planned events throughout the year. During warmer months the triangle hosts a Farmers Market every Wednesday afternoon.

The Free Blockbuster Box is located outside of South Fellini 1507 E. Passyunk Avenue, a public movie exchange where people can take or leave a DVD, VHS or Betamax.

Education

Schools

Saints John Neumann and Maria Goretti Catholic High School, a Roman Catholic high school for 9th to 12th grade, 1736 South 10th Street.
Southwark School, a Philadelphia Public School for Pre-K to 8th grade, 1835 S. 9th St.
St. Anthony of Padua Regional Catholic School, for Pre-K to 8th grade, 913 Pierce Street.

Public libraries

The Free Library of Philadelphia's South Philadelphia Library branch, at 1700 South Broad Street, serves this neighborhood.

Recreation and community centers

East Passyunk Community Recreation Center, 1025 Mifflin Street
United Communities Houston Center, 2029 South 8th Street
James Otis Ford Playground and Recreation Center, 631 Snyder Avenue

Postal facility

The United States Postal Service operates its Castle Branch at 1713 South Broad Street.

Public transit

SEPTA stations of the Broad Street Subway are located at Tasker-Morris (with entrances on both Tasker Street and Morris Street) and Snyder Avenue. It also operates several bus routes:
Broad Street Route 4, northbound and southbound
12th Street Route 45, southbound
11th Street Route 45, northbound
9th Street Route 47M, northbound
8th Street Routes 47 and 47M, southbound
7th Street Route 47, northbound
Snyder Avenue Route 79, eastbound and westbound
Morris Street Route 29, eastbound
Tasker Street Route 29, westbound

Houses of worship

St. Nicholas of Tolentine Roman Catholic Church
St. John's Baptist Church
Indonesian Light Church Philadelphia
International Bethel Church
Bethany Indonesian Church of God
Abundant Life Chinese Church
Prophetic Church of Christ
First Christian Assembly
Abundant Harvest House of Prayer
Little David Baptist Church
St. George Coptic Orthodox Center
Indonesian Full Gospel Fellowship Church
South Philadelphia Shtiebel
Zhen Ru Temple Zhen Buddhist temple
Iglesia De Cristo Misionera

District and local organization

State Senate district
 First, Nikil Saval (D)

State House district
 184th, Elizabeth Fiedler (D)

City Council district
 First, Mark Squilla (D)

Ward
 1st
 39th

Police district
 Third

Civic groups and town watches
The East Passyunk Crossing Civic Association and Town Watch, Inc. aims to "advance the civic pride and preserve the historic integrity" of the area. The organization's activities are directed by five standing committees: Beautification (Clean and Green), Public Safety/Town Watch, Zoning/Planning, Community Relations (Marketing and Events) and Membership. Activities include monthly street clean-ups, neighborhood fairs, weekly Town Watch patrols and representation at local Zoning Board Commission hearings.

See also

 Passyunk Township, Pennsylvania
Main Street Programs in the United States
Angelo Bruno, head of the Philadelphia Crime Family who lived at 10th and Snyder.

References 

Neighborhoods in Philadelphia
Gay villages in Pennsylvania
Little Italys in the United States
South Philadelphia